Sempervivoideae is the largest of three subfamilies in the Saxifragales family Crassulaceae, with about 20–30 genera with succulent leaves. Unlike the two smaller subfamilies, it is distributed in temperate climates. The largest genus in this subfamily is Sedum, with about 470 species.

Description 

Succulent leaved plants. Unlike the other two smaller subfamilies, which are highly derived, Sempervivoideae retain the basic features of the family Crassulaceae. The Sempervivoideae contain many familiar horticultural plants, such as Sedum.

Taxonomy 

Sempervivoideae has taxonomic priority over its synonym, Sedoideae, and is related to the other Crassulaceae subfamilies, as shown in this cladogram, although Messerschmid and colleagues (2020) state that these three subfamily clades are successive sisters, rather than Sempervivoideae being a direct sister only to Kalanchoideae.

Subdivisions 

Six clades within Sempervivoideae have been segregated into five tribes  with about thirty genera.

The composition of the five tribes are: (number of genera/species);
 Telephieae (6/50)
 Umbiliceae (4/100)
 Semperviveae (2/75)
 Aeonieae (3/70)
 Sedeae (7/520)

and their relationship is shown in the cladogram:

However, given the difficulty of establishing a stable classification, some authors prefer larger groupings, e.g.;
 Telephinae (Telephieae, Umbilicieae)
 Sedinae (Semperviveae, Aeonieae, Sedeae)

Alternatively, Messerschmid and colleagues (2020), based on the largest analysis of subfamily taxa, propose the following clade structure (with tribes) and number of genera, species;
 Telephium (Telephieae, Umbiliceae) 9, 160
 Sempervivum (Semperviveae) 3, 60
 Aeonium (Aeonieae) 4, 67 (+ Sedum p.p. 8 sp.)
 Leucosedum (Sedeae p.p.) 6,80 (+ Sedum p.p. 120 sp.)
 Acre (Sedeae p.p.) 7, 205 (+ Sedum p.p. 345 sp.)

In this analysis, these clades and tribes were related as shown in this cladogram;

Semperviviae, Aeonieae and Sedeae are definable only by plesiomorphic features, with their genera all derived from within Sedum. Segregates of Sedum occur in  each of these, but lack sufficient features to allow them to be allocated to definitive genera.

Genera 

Many of the genera in this subfamily have been considered non-monophyletic. Other than the Sempervivum clade, Sedum has never formed a monophyletic group, but rather is scattered through the remaining clades, and thus is highly polyphyletic (or paraphyletic). This has been referred to as the "Sedum problem". Given the monophyly demonstrated for Aeonieae and Semperviveae (as quite distinct from Sedeae), it has been recommended that those species of Sedum originally found in those tribes, be removed from the genus and reassigned. This includes Sedum series Rupestria from Semperviveae, but collectively account for only a small fraction of the genus. While restricting Sedum to Sedeae simplifies the infrafamilial structure of the genus, its species remain distributed within both clades of this tribe. Sedum, with about 470 species, is by far the largest (and most problematic) genus within the subfamily, and the family Crassulaceae.

Evolution and biogeography 

There is no known fossil record of Crassulaceae. The Crassulaceae family evolved approximately 100 million years ago (mya) in southern Africa with the two most basal phylogenetic branches (Crassula, Kalanchoe) representing the predominantly southern African members. Divergence times are shown in Cladogram III. The family had a gradual evolution, with a basal split between Crassuloideae and the rest of the family (Kalanchoideae, Sempervivoideae) at 82 mya, and Sempervivoideae splitting from Kalanchoideae at 71 mya. The Sempervivoideae subsequently dispersed north to the Mediterranean region, and from there to Eastern Europe and Asia (Sempervivum and Leucosedum clades), with multiple groups spreading over the three continents of the Northern Hemisphere. The Telephium clade splitting from the rest of the subfamily at 66 mya. This was followed by the Petrosedum and Aeonium clades at 56 mya and Sempervivum/Jovibarda at 52 mya. The remaining two clades, constituting Sedeae (Leucosedum and Acre) separating from each other at 48 mya. Two lineages from the European Crassulaceae eventually dispersed to North America and underwent subsequent diversification. The Aeonium clade dispersed from northern Africa to adjacent Macaronesia.

Notes

References

Bibliography

Books 
 
  (full text at ResearchGate)

Articles

Websites 
 
 , in Flora of China online vol. 8

External links 

Crassulaceae
Plant subfamilies